During the 1988–89 English football season, Norwich City competed in the Football League First Division.

Season summary
Norwich were tipped by many to struggle during the season, but shocked the rest of the First Division by going top in September; by the end of October, they held a six-point lead over Arsenal, having played a game more. The lead at the top was maintained until December, finished the season in fourth - until 1993, this was their highest ever league placing. They also reached the semi-finals of the FA Cup, losing to Everton, which had made them unlikely contenders for the double of the league title and FA Cup this season - an accolade which had only previously been achieved five times in a whole century of league football in England.

Norwich's fourth place in the league saw them finish only behind champions Arsenal, runners-up Liverpool and third placed Nottingham Forest. They finished above a number of higher-spending and traditionally better-supported and more successful clubs including Everton, Manchester United and relegated Newcastle United.

Stars of the season included goalkeeper Bryan Gunn, defender Andy Linighan, midfielder Mike Phelan, winger Dale Gordon and striker Robert Fleck. However, it was the last season at Carrow Road for Phelan, who was then sold to Manchester United.

Squad
Squad at end of season

Left club during season

Reserve team

Youth team

Transfers

In
 Andy Townsend - Southampton, £300,000, 31 August 1988

Out
 Kevin Drinkell - Rangers, £600,000
 Kenny Brown - Plymouth Argyle

Final league table

Results

First Division

League Cup

FA Cup

Awards
 Barry Butler Memorial Trophy for Norwich City F.C. Player of the Year: Dale Gordon

References

Norwich City F.C. seasons
Norwich City